The Cape Verde – Mauritania Maritime Delimitation Treaty is a treaty between Cape Verde and Mauritania in which the two states agreed to the delimitation of their maritime boundary.

The treaty was signed at Praia on 19 September 2003 and was ratified by Cape Verde on 23 April 2004.

The official name for the treaty is Treaty on the Delimitation of the Maritime Frontier between the Islamic Republic of Mauritania and the Republic of Cape Verde.

References

External links
Full text of treaty

2003 in Cape Verde
2003 in Mauritania
Borders of Cape Verde
Borders of Mauritania
Boundary treaties
Treaties of Cape Verde
Treaties of Mauritania
Treaties concluded in 2003
United Nations treaties